was a statesman and diplomat, active in Meiji period Japan.

Biography
Motono was born in Saga, Hizen Province, (modern-day Saga Prefecture). His father, an entrepreneur, was one of the founders of the modern Yomiuri Shimbun. Motono studied law in France, and in 1896 translated the civil code of the Japanese Empire into French  . He served as Minister Plenipotentiary to the Kingdom of Belgium in 1898–1901, and in that capacity represented the Empire of Japan at the 1899 Hague Peace Conference. In 1905 he served as a judge at the Permanent Court of Arbitration, and formed a dissential opinion in the case of the Japanese Tax House . He served as the Japanese Ambassador to the Empire of Russia from 1906 to 1916.

On June 14, 1907, he was granted the title of baron (danshaku) under the kazoku peerage system for his services, and was also awarded the Order of the Rising Sun, 1st class. His title was elevated to that of viscount (shishaku) on  July 14, 1916. Under the cabinet of Terauchi Masatake, he served as foreign minister of Japan between October 9, 1916 and his resignation on April 23, 1918. He was noted for his harsh stance against the Russian Revolution and his support of the Siberian Intervention. He died on September 17, 1918, and was awarded the Order of the Chrysanthemum.

References
 Klaus Schlichtmann, "Japan and the Two Hague Peace Conferences, 1899 and 1907" paper presented at the 41st INTERNATIONAL CONFERENCE OF  EASTERN STUDIES, Tokyo, on May 10, 1996 
 Klaus Schlichtmann, "Japan, Germany and the Idea of the Hague Peace Conferences" Journal of Peace Research, vol. 40, no. 4, 2003, pp. 385–402 
 Article in the New York Times on a speech by Motono to Parliament .
 Article in the New York Times regarding Motono's death .

Japanese diplomats
1862 births
1918 deaths
People from Saga (city)
Kazoku
People of Meiji-period Japan
Recipients of the Order of the Rising Sun
Foreign ministers of Japan
Members of the Permanent Court of Arbitration
Japanese judges of international courts and tribunals